The following lists events that happened during 1859 in South Africa.

Incumbents
 Governor of the Cape of Good Hope and High Commissioner for Southern Africa: Sir George Grey.
 Lieutenant-governor of the Colony of Natal: John Scott.
 State President of the Orange Free State:
 Jacobus Nicolaas Boshoff (until 5 September).
 Esaias Reynier Snijman (acting from 6 September).
 President of the Executive Council of the South African Republic: Marthinus Wessel Pretorius.

Events
September
 6 – Esaias Reynier Snijman becomes the acting State President of the Orange Free State.
 8 – The first railway locomotive in South Africa is brought ashore in Cape Town.

Births
 11 January – John Tengo Jabavu, political activist and newspaper editor. (d. 1921)
 1 May – Willem Johannes Leyds, attorney-general of the South African Republic. (d. 1940)

Deaths

Railways

Railway lines
 Construction begins on the Cape Town-Wellington Railway.

Locomotives
 8 September – A small 0-4-0 tank steam locomotive is landed in Cape Town, to be used during construction of the first railway in South Africa.

References

South Africa
Years in South Africa
History of South Africa